You Don't Know Me: The Songs of Cindy Walker is the 54th studio album by American country and western musician Willie Nelson. It was released on March 16, 2006, by the Lost Highway label. All tracks on the album were written by Cindy Walker. A video has been made for the track "You Don't Know Me". The album was released nine days before Walker's death.

Track listing
All tracks composed by Cindy Walker; except where indicated
 "Bubbles in My Beer" (Tommy Duncan, Cindy Walker, Bob Wills) – 2:51
 "Not That I Care" – 2:57
 "Take Me in Your Arms & Hold Me" – 3:22
 "Don't Be Ashamed of Your Age" (Cindy Walker, Bob Wills) – 3:34
 "You Don't Know Me" (Cindy Walker, Eddy Arnold) – 3:42
 "Sugar Moon" – 2:28
 "I Don't Care" (Cindy Walker, Webb Pierce) – 2:56
 "Cherokee Maiden" – 3:09
 "The Warm Red Wine" – 2:51
 "Miss Molly" – 2:34
 "Dusty Skies" – 3:34
 "It's All Your Fault" – 2:36
 "I Was Just Walkin' Out the Door" – 2:54

Chart performance

References

External links
 Willie Nelson's Official Website
 Lost Highway Records Official Website

2006 albums
Willie Nelson albums
Cindy Walker tribute albums
Albums produced by Fred Foster
Lost Highway Records albums